The 2021 Liga 3 Papua was the fourth season of Liga 3 Papua as a qualifying round for the national round of the 2021–22 Liga 3.

Persemi Mimika were the defending champion.

Teams
There was 9 teams participated in the league this season.

First round

Group A

Group B

Second round

Knockout stage

Semi final

Third place play-off

Final

References

Liga 3
Sport in Papua (province)